William Short or William Shortt may refer to:

 William Short (Alberta politician) (1866–1926), Mayor of Edmonton, Alberta
 William Short (American ambassador) (1759–1849), United States Minister Plenipotentiary to France, 1790–1792
 William Short (footballer), English footballer
 William Short (priest) (c. 1760 – 1826), Archdeacon of Cornwall
 William Henry Short (1884–1916), English recipient of the Victoria Cross
 William J. Short (1864–1939), member of the Legislative Assembly of Manitoba
 Bill Short (born 1937), American baseball pitcher
 Bill Shortt (1920–2004), Welsh footballer
 William Allaire Shortt (1859–1915), American politician
 William Hamilton Shortt (1881–1971), English railway engineer and horologist

See also
 William A. Short House, Helena, Arkansas